Marc Gicquel was the defending champion, but he lost in the Second Round to Nicolas Mahut 3–6, 5–7.
Martin Kližan won the title defeating Teymuraz Gabashvili in the final 7–5, 6–3.

Seeds

Draw

Finals

Top half

Bottom half

External Links
 Main Draw
 Qualifying Draw

BNP Paribas Primrose Bordeaux - Singles
2012 Singles